Deinypena is a genus of moths of the family Erebidae.

Species
Deinypena apicata Hampson, 1910
Deinypena bifasciata Gaede, 1940
Deinypena biplagalis Viette, 1954
Deinypena bipunctata Gaede, 1940
Deinypena congoana Gaede, 1940
Deinypena ereboides Holland, 1894
Deinypena fulvida Holland, 1920
Deinypena lacista Holland, 1894
Deinypena laportei Berio, 1974
Deinypena lathetica Holland, 1894
Deinypena marginepunctata Holland, 1894
Deinypena nyasana Hampson, 1926
Deinypena obscura Holland, 1920
Deinypena praerupta Gaede, 1940
Deinypena ranomafana Viette, 1966
Deinypena subapicalis Gaede, 1940

References

External links

Calpinae